Bronson Independent School District was a public school district based in the community of Bronson, Texas (USA).

The district existed from 1905 until 1962, when it consolidated with Pineland schools to form the West Sabine Independent School District.

Former school districts in Texas
School districts in Sabine County, Texas
School districts established in 1905
School districts disestablished in 1962
1905 establishments in Texas
1962 disestablishments in Texas